General Sir Evelyn Hugh Barker  (22 May 1894 – 23 November 1983) was a British Army officer who saw service in both the First World War and the Second World War. During the latter, he commanded the 10th Brigade during the Battle of France in 1940, the 49th (West Riding) Infantry Division and the VIII Corps in the Western Europe Campaign from 1944 to 1945.

After the war, Barker was the General Officer Commanding (GOC) of the British Forces in Palestine and Trans-Jordan from 1946 to 1947, during the Palestine Emergency. He is remembered for his anti-Semitism and his controversial order in the wake of the King David Hotel bombing in July 1946 in which he declared, "[We] will be punishing the Jews in a way the race dislikes as much as any, by striking at their pockets and showing our contempt of them".

Early life
Born in Southsea, Hampshire, England, on 22 May 1894, Evelyn Hugh Barker was the son of Major General Sir George Barker, a British Army officer of the Royal Engineers, and Hon. Clemency Hubbard, daughter of John Hubbard, 1st Baron Addington, as the youngest of two children and the only son. He was educated at Wellington College, Berkshire, later entering the Royal Military College, Sandhurst, where, on 5 February 1913, he passed out and was commissioned into the King's Royal Rifle Corps (KRRC) of the British Army. He was posted to the 4th Battalion, KRRC, which was then serving in Gharial, British India.

First World War
Barker, who had by now gained the nickname "Bubbles", was still in India with his battalion when the First World War began in August 1914. In November, the battalion was dispatched back to the United Kingdom, and joined the 27th Division. On 27 November, Barker was promoted to the temporary rank of lieutenant. The following month, the 27th Division was deployed to the Western Front in France. Barker was wounded in March 1915, during the actions of St Eloi Craters. In November 1915, after having recovered from his injury, dispatched to the Salonica front along with his battalion, where he would remain for the rest of the war. On 10 April 1916, Barker was promoted to captain and became the battalion's adjutant. He remained in this role until August 1917, when he became a General Staff Officer Grade 3 (GSO3) on the headquarters of the 22nd Division. He relinquished this appointment on 11 January 1918, upon becoming a brigade major with the 67th Brigade. By the end of the war, he had been wounded twice, awarded the Military Cross and the Italian Silver Medal of Military Valor, and twice mentioned in despatches. On 3 June 1919, he was awarded the Distinguished Service Order. 

In 1919, Barker took part in the British military expedition in the Russian Civil War.

Interwar period
Barker remained in the army during the interwar period and was promoted to captain on 19 August 1920. He later returned to the United Kingdom and served as a GSO3 at the War Office and later at Southern Command. In 1923, he married Violet Eleanor. They had one son, George Worsley Barker. Barker then served on regimental duties for several years before he attended the Staff College, Camberley, from 1927 to 1928. After graduation, he was assigned back to the KRRC. On 1 July 1929, he was promoted to brevet major. On 4 December 1929, he returned to the War Office as a GSO3.

On 1 July 1934, Barker was made a brevet lieutenant-colonel and assigned to the 8th Infantry Brigade, part of the 3rd Infantry Division. In June 1936, Barker became Commanding Officer of the 2nd Battalion, KRRC.

The battalion was dispatched to Palestine on internal security duties, during the 1936–39 Arab revolt in Palestine. In 1937, the battalion was converted into a motorised infantry formation and returned to the United Kingdom to become part of the Mobile Division (later the 1st Armoured Division).

In late July 1938, Barker relinquished his battalion command. On 1 August, he was promoted to brevet colonel and was given the temporary rank of brigadier for his new command, the 10th Infantry Brigade (part of the 4th Infantry Division). Barker, who was 44, had been 
selected over those who had seniority and indicated that Barker's superiors regarded him highly. That move caused some resentment with other officers who had been passed over.

Second World War

France and Belgium
In October 1939, one month after the start of the Second World War, Barker took his brigade to France as part of the British Expeditionary Force (BEF). The 10th Brigade formed part of the 4th Division.

After many months of relative inactivity, called the Phoney War, Germany on 10 May launched its assault on the Western Front. Barker was on leave in England and immediately returned to France. The division advanced to Brussels but, after a strategic reverse in the campaign, was forced to retreat soon afterwards. On 27 May, Barker's brigade was briefly transferred to the 5th Division and fought to hold the Ypres-Comines canal against an assault by three German divisions. The day after, Barker and his brigade were ordered to retreat to Dunkirk. His brigade sustained heavy losses during the campaign, and was evacuated to England on 31 May. The historian Peter Young, then a platoon commander in Barker's brigade, was impressed by Barker during this period and wrote he was "the coolest man you could wish to see under fire. He seemed to like it; indeed I feel sure that he did. He liked to observe his officers and men in times of stress, because it helped to weigh them up. After so many years I am not ashamed to confess that I always felt braver when he was present".

Home front
In England, he retained command of the brigade until 5 October 1940. He then spent the next two months as member of a Transportation Committee, which saw him temporarily reduced to the rank of colonel. He was mentioned in despatches on 26 July, and made a Commander of the Order of the British Empire on 20 August for his services in France and Belgium.

On 11 February 1941, Barker was promoted to the acting rank of major-general and made General Officer Commanding (GOC) of the 54th (East Anglian) Infantry Division. During his tenure, Barker trained the division to prepare them to repel a potential German invasion. On 30 April 1943, Barker became GOC of the 49th (West Riding) Infantry Division.

The 49th Division had previously garrisoned Iceland and adopted a polar bear as its insignia. Barker believed the original design looked too timid and had the polar bear redesigned into a more aggressive-looking animal. When Barker became GOC, the division had been selected to join the British Second Army to take part in the Allies' invasion of Normandy. It was initially assigned to be an assault division in the opening of the invasion and as a result Barker had his men undertake amphibious warfare training. On 1 January 1944, Barker was made a Companion of the Order of the Bath. In early 1944, the invasion plan was updated and the 49th Division assigned to a follow-up role rather than being an assault division.

Northwestern Europe
The 49th Division landed in Normandy, as part of Operation Overlord, on 12 June 1944. Barker was confident about the ability of his troops and wrote in his diary on 2 June "I have a first class party to go with − I am satisfied that my chaps are in as good, if not better shape, than any others.... It will be a grim business but what fun when we see the Boche start to crack. After all these years of waiting I wouldn't miss this for anything".

The division's first contact with German forces came near Tilly-sur-Seulles on 16 June. Barker"s division led Operation Martlet, an attack to support a larger offensive codenamed Operation Epsom. The division eventually secured its objective and fended off repeated German counterattacks over four days and inflicted heavy tank losses. Barker's direction of the division during the action impressed his superiors.

The division played a minor role in the rest of the campaign and helped capture Le Havre during Operation Astonia.

On 21 September, the division moved into Belgium and liberated Turnhout. Barker's division undertook defensive duties and captured the Dutch town of Roosendaal on 30 October after ten days of hard fighting. By the month's end, the division was at Willemstad.

In November, Barker's division was assigned to clear the west bank of the River Maas on the Dutch-German frontier. On 28 November, Barker met Montgomery and Lieutenant-General Miles Dempsey, GOC Second Army. Both had been impressed with Barker's handling of the 49th Division and assigned him to command of the VIII Corps. As part of taking his new command, Barker was promoted to the acting rank of lieutenant-general on 2 December. His first action as Corps GOC was to oversee the Corps role in the final stages of Operation Nutcracker.

VIII Corps saw further action during the final push into Germany between March and May 1945. Barker's corps captured Osnabrück, Minden, Celle, and Lüneburg. It also liberated the survivors of the Bergen-Belsen concentration camp.

After the German capitulation and the end of World War II in Europe, Montgomery appointed Barker to head the Schleswig-Holstein Corps District of the British occupation zone. Barker was knighted as a Knight Commander of the Order of the British Empire on 5 July 1945. During the entire campaign, Barker was twice mentioned in despatches.

Postwar
On 31 December 1945, Barker was made an Honorary Colonel of the Duke of York's Own Loyal Suffolk Hussars. He held this position until 1 September 1950. He was also made colonel commandant of the KRRC from 11 February 1946 to 10 February 1956. On 5 May 1946, his rank of lieutenant-general was made permanent.

Palestine
Barker was dispatched to Palestine and appointed GOC of the British Forces in Palestine and Trans-Jordan.

Relationship with Katie Antonius
Soon after arriving in Palestine, Barker became a frequenter of the Jerusalem high society gatherings in the mansion of Katie Antonius, who was the widow of George Antonius. The evening dances in the Karm al Mufti mansion, the Shepherd Hotel, were attended by diplomats, artists and British officers. Barker engaged in an affair with Katie.

Advocate of death penalty
Barker saw capital punishment as an effective discouragement against resorting to arms and argued for a wide application of the death penalty to Zionist guerillas. That it had never been applied in the preceding years he considered among the major causes of the failure to suppress the insurgency. Barker later expressed his position:

In his position on the death penalty, Barker was strongly supported by Montgomery. On 18 June 1946, the Irgun, a group of Zionist militants, abducted five British officers, to be held as hostages for recently-condemned militants. Montgomery, now Chief of the Imperial Staff, travelled to Palestine and met with Barker. Montgomery recalled:

Operation Agatha
In June 1946, Barker planned a large-scale police operation throughout the Yishuv. Having the long-awaited order to arrest the leaders of the Jewish Agency, which was now strongly believed to be complicit in terrorism, Barker organised Operation Agatha in great secrecy and with the hope of delivering a strong blow to the guerillas. The operation began on 29 June, with tens of thousands of soldiers and policemen employed in a cordon-and-search action in almost every Jewish settlement. By the end of the day, over 2,700 Jews had been detained, including some leaders of the Jewish Agency. Dozens of weapon caches were found, including one in the Great Synagogue of Tel Aviv.

Order prohibiting social interaction with Jews
On 22 July 1946, the King David Hotel in Jerusalem was bombed. The hotel housed Barker's office and the British headquarters for the Palestinian mandate. Barker was present but was not among the injured. Afterwards, Barker drafted an order that placed "out of bounds to all ranks all Jewish establishments, restaurants, shop, and private dwellings". The order forbade British soldiers in Palestine from having "social intercourse with any Jew" and noted, "I appreciate that these measures will inflict some hardship on the troops, yet I am certain that if my reasons are fully explained to them they will understand their propriety and will be punishing the Jews in a way the race dislikes as much as any, by striking at their pockets and showing our contempt of them".

Barker later regretted issuing the order and recollected:

Operation Shark
With information that the Irgun ring that was responsible for the King David Hotel bombing was hiding in Tel Aviv, Barker organised a massive police operation in the city. His instructions were short: "I want you to search Tel Aviv, every single room and attic and cellar in Tel Aviv. Is that quite clear?"

The police action in Tel Aviv, codenamed Operation Shark, began on 30 July and achieved several successes. However, the most important figure of the Zionist underground, Menachem Begin, slipped through British hands. Barker later recalled: "We should have caught him, but the men did not search his house properly. This is one of the problems of search operations. You have to rely on very junior people, and, if they make a mistake, the whole operation can be damaged."

On 24 January 1947, Barker confirmed the death sentence of the Irgun fighter, Dov Gruner. Barker later said in an interview:

Assassination plots
Barker was the target of several assassination efforts, which included explosive devices placed around his Palestinian residence. The future President of Israel, Ezer Weizman, was one of Barker's several attempted assassins. After Weizman's effort was revealed in 1977, Barker commented:

Last years of military service and retirement
Barker left Palestine in February 1947, and returned to the United Kingdom. Despite controversy surrounding his command in Palestine, Barker was largely unknown to the public. On 15 November 1948, he was promoted to a full general, with seniority backdated to 3 October 1946. On 2 January 1950, he was made Knight Commander of the Order of the Bath. From 6 July 1949 to 18 March 1950, he was aide-de-camp general to the George VI. On 18 March 1950, Barker retired from military service. 

On 1 January 1951, he was made the Honorary Colonel of the 286th (Hertfordshire and Bedfordshire Yeomanry) Regiment, Royal Artillery, and held that post until 31 December 1962. He was Deputy Lieutenant for the county of Bedfordshire from 12 July 1952 until 20 April 1967.

Anti-Semitism
Barker's letters to his mistress, Katie Antonius, contained passages that were overtly anti-Semitic. For example, he described his feelings towards the Jews in Palestine in an April 1947 letter: "Yes I loathe the lot – whether they be Zionists or not. Why should we be afraid of saying we hate them. Its time this damned race knew what we think of them – loathsome people".

References

Bibliography

Commando to Captain-General: The Life of Brigadier Peter Young, Alison Michelli

External links

British Army Officers 1939–1945
Generals of World War II

|-

|-

|-

|-

|-

1894 births
1983 deaths
Administrators of Palestine
British Army generals of World War II
British Army personnel of the Russian Civil War
British Army personnel of World War I
British military personnel of the Palestine Emergency
British military personnel of the 1936–1939 Arab revolt in Palestine
Commandeurs of the Légion d'honneur
Companions of the Distinguished Service Order
Deputy Lieutenants of Bedfordshire
Graduates of the Royal Military College, Sandhurst
Graduates of the Staff College, Camberley
King's Royal Rifle Corps officers
Knights Commander of the Order of the Bath
Knights Commander of the Order of the British Empire
Military personnel from Portsmouth
People educated at Summer Fields School
People educated at Wellington College, Berkshire
People from Southsea
Recipients of the Military Cross
Recipients of the Silver Medal of Military Valor
British Army generals